Michael Arthur Holmes (born 9 September 1965) is an English professional footballer who played as a midfielder in the Football League for eight teams during the 1980s and 1990s.

Career
Born in Bradford, Holmes began his professional career when he joined Bradford City his home town team on a non-contract basis, making his league debut during the 1984–85 season. After only a handful of appearances at Valley Parade, he moved on to Wolverhampton Wanderers in November 1985. He made his Wolves' debut on 30 November 1985 in a 1–1 draw at Cardiff City.

The midfielder became a regular player at Molineux, but could not halt relegation to the fourth tier. The 1986–87 season proved his best with the club as he played in a majority of the games, helping them to the play-offs. He scored eight times during the campaign – all coming in a nine-match hot streak. Several new signings in the close season meant Holmes' second season didn't offer as much playing time, but he still managed 30 appearances in all competitions as the club lifted the Fourth Division championship. He also played in every game in their success in the Football League Trophy.

He was released in summer 1988, whereupon he joined Huddersfield Town in a short-lived move. He ended the season with an equally swift stay at Cambridge United, before signing for Rochdale. His spell there saw the club reach the fifth round of the FA Cup for the first time in their history, but after making over 60 appearances, he moved on again, signing for Torquay United, then Carlisle United and Northampton Town, but his professional career was ended at the age of 29 by a back injury sustained in a car crash. He then moved into non-league football with Wisbech Town.

After spending several years in the pub trade, as a representative and running a pub-restaurant, Holmes and wife Bernadette run a sandwich shop in Leicester. He combines the role with coaching football at Leicester College, and is also co-manager, alongside former Leicester City player Matt Elliott, of Oadby Town in the Midland Alliance.

References

External links
League stats at Neil Brown's site
Wolves Heroes feature

1965 births
Living people
Sportspeople from Blackpool
English footballers
Association football midfielders
Bradford City A.F.C. players
Wolverhampton Wanderers F.C. players
Huddersfield Town A.F.C. players
Cambridge United F.C. players
Rochdale A.F.C. players
Torquay United F.C. players
Carlisle United F.C. players
Northampton Town F.C. players
Wisbech Town F.C. players
English Football League players
English football managers